The Visigoths entered Hispania (modern Spain and Portugal) in 415 and they rose to be the dominant people there until the Umayyad conquest of Hispania of 711 brought their kingdom to an end.

This period in Iberian art is dominated by their style. Visigothic art is generally considered in the English-speaking world to be a strain of Migration art, while the Portuguese- and Spanish-speaking worlds generally classify it as Pre-Romanesque.

Branches of Visigothic art include their architecture, crafts (especially jewellery), and their script.

Visigothic architecture

The only remaining examples of Visigothic architecture from the 6th century are the church of San Cugat del Vallés in Barcelona, the hermitage and church of Santa Maria de Lara in Burgos, Saint Frutuoso Chapel in Braga, the church of São Gião in Nazaré and the few remnants of the church at Cabeza de Griego in Cuenca. However, their style developed over the next centuries, though the prime remaining examples of it are mostly rural and often run-down. Some of the characteristics of their architecture are:
 Generally basilican in layout, sometimes a Greek cross plan or, more rarely, a combination of the two. The spaces are highly compartmentalised.
 Horseshoe arches without keystones.
 A rectangular, exterior apse.
 Use of columns and pillars with Corinthian capitals of unique design.
 Barrel vaults with cupolas at the crosses.
 Frequent use of marble as material.
 Walls of ashlar blocks, occasionally alternating with Roman brickwork.
 Decoration commonly of animal or plant motifs.

Examples include:
 Church of San Juan Bautista , province of Palencia, Spain.
 Crypt of San Antolín in the cathedral of Palencia, province of Palencia, Spain.
 Church of Santa Comba in Bande, province of Ourense, Spain.
 Chapel of San Xes (or San Ginés) de Francelos in Ribadavia, province of Ourense, Spain.
 Church of San Pedro de la Mata (in ruins) in Sonseca, province of Toledo, Spain.
 Church of Santa María de Melque in San Martín de Montalbán, province of Toledo, Spain.
 Suso monastery at San Millán de la Cogolla, La Rioja, Spain.
 Basilica of Santa María de Batres in Carranque, province of Toledo, Spain.
 Hermitage of Santa María in Quintanilla de las Viñas, province of Burgos, Spain.
 Church of Santa Lucía del Trampal near Alcuéscarprovince of Cáceres, Spain.
 Crypt of the Monastery of San Salvador de Leyre, Navarre, Spain.
 Church of San Miguel de los Fresnos (in ruins) in Fregenal de la Sierra, province of Badajoz, Spain.
 Interior of church of San Pedro de la Nave, province of Zamora, Spain.
 Saint Frutuoso Chapel in Braga, Portugal.
 Church of São Gião in Nazaré, Portugal.
 church of San Pedro de la Nave in San Pedro de la Nave-Almendra.

See also
 Treasure of Guarrazar
 Verona Orational
 Visigoths
 Goths

References

 "Visigothic art". In Encyclopædia Britannica Online.

External links 

 Age of spirituality : late antique and early Christian art, third to seventh century from The Metropolitan Museum of Art
 El portal del Arte Románico; Visigothic, Mozarabic and Romanesque art in Spain.

 
Architectural history
Early Germanic architecture